General William Lygon Pakenham, 4th Earl of Longford    (31 January 1819 – 19 April 1887), styled The Honourable William Pakenham before 1860, was an Anglo-Irish soldier and Conservative politician.

Early life and education
Pakenham was the second son of Thomas Pakenham, 2nd Earl of Longford, by Lady Georgiana Emma Charlotte Lygon, daughter of William Lygon, 1st Earl Beauchamp. He was educated at Winchester College and entered the army in 1837. A year prior to his entry into the army, Pakenham played a single first-class cricket match for the Gentlemen in the Gentlemen v Players fixture of 1836 at Lord's. He, however, had no success in the match, twice being dismissed without scoring.

Military career
After service in both the Crimean War and the Indian Rebellion, Pakenham became Adjutant-General in India in November 1858. He was also colonel of the Northumberland Fusiliers from 1878 to his death.

Public life
He succeeded in the earldom in 1860 on the death of his elder brother, the third Earl and was created KCB in 1861. He sat on the Conservative benches in the House of Lords and served as Under-Secretary of State for War from 1866 to 1868 under first the Earl of Derby and later Benjamin Disraeli. In February 1870 he was voted chairman of the Central Protestant Defence Association which was established in response to the Irish Church Act 1869. He also served as Lord Lieutenant of Longford from 1874 to 1887. In Dublin, he was a member of the Kildare Street Club.

He was created KCB in the 1861 Birthday Honours and GCB in the 1881 Birthday Honours.

Family
Lord Longford married the Honourable Selina Rice-Trevor, daughter of George Rice-Trevor, 4th Baron Dynevor, in 1862. They had four surviving children: Thomas, Lord Pakenham, the Hon. Edward Michael, Lady Georgiana Frances Henrietta (wife of Hugh Gough, 3rd Viscount Gough) and Lady Catherine Louisa (mother of William Fletcher-Vane, 1st Baron Inglewood). Lord Longford died in April 1887, aged 68, and was succeeded in the earldom by his second but eldest surviving son. His grandson Frank Pakenham, 7th Earl of Longford, became a prominent Labour politician. The Countess of Longford survived her husband by over thirty years and died in January 1918, aged 81.

References

|-

|-

1819 births
1887 deaths
Conservative Party (UK) hereditary peers
Lord-Lieutenants of Longford
Royal Northumberland Fusiliers officers
William
Companions of the Order of the Bath
Knights Grand Cross of the Order of the Bath
4
English cricketers
Gentlemen cricketers